This local electoral calendar for 2018 lists the subnational elections held in 2018. Referendums, retention elections, and national by-elections (special elections) are also included.

January
5–6 January: Czech Republic, Trutnov, Senate by-election (1st round)
12–13 January: Czech Republic, Trutnov, Senate by-election (2nd round)
17 January: India, Madhya Pradesh, Municipal Councils
24 January: Mozambique, Nampula, Mayor by-election (1st round)
27 January: Nigeria, Osun, Local Government Councils and Chairmen
28 January: 
Austria, Lower Austria, Parliament
France, Territoire de Belfort and Val-d'Oise, National Assembly by-elections (1st round)
29 January: India, Ajmer, Alwar and Uluberia, House of the People by-elections

February
4 February: 
France, Territoire de Belfort and Val-d'Oise, National Assembly by-elections 
Guinea, 
Japan
Nagasaki, Governor
Yamaguchi, Governor
Montenegro, Municipal Assemblies
6 February: United Kingdom, Wales, Alyn and Deeside, National Assembly by-election
8 February: Australia, Lord Howe Island, Board
10 February: 
Nigeria, Kano, Local Government Councils and Chairmen
Sri Lanka, Municipal Councils, Urban Councils and Divisional Councils
12 February: Pakistan, NA-154, National Assembly by-election
13 February: United States, Oklahoma City, Mayor
18 February: 
Belarus, Regional Councils, District Councils and Municipal Councils
India, Tripura, Legislative Assembly
25 February: 
Austria, Tyrol,  Parliament
Germany, Frankfurt, 
27 February: India
Meghalaya, Legislative Assembly
Nagaland, Legislative Assembly

March
3 March: 
Australia, Tasmania, House of Assembly
Nigeria, Edo, Local Government Councils and Chairmen
4 March: 
Austria, Carinthia, Parliament
El Salvador, 
France, French Guiana, National Assembly by-election (1st round)
Italy
Lazio, Regional Council
Lombardy, Regional Council
Serbia, Belgrade, City Assembly
Switzerland
Aargau, 
Appenzell Ausserrhoden, 
Basel-Landschaft, 
Basel-Stadt, referendums
Bern, 
Fribourg, 
Glarus, Executive Council
Jura, referendums
Lucerne, 
Nidwalden, Executive Council and Landrat
Obwalden, Executive Council (1st round) and Cantonal Council
Schaffhausen, referendum
Schwyz, 
St. Gallen, 
Valais, 
Vaud, referendum
Zürich, 
Zürich City, 
5 March: Jamaica, Saint Andrew North Western, House of Representatives by-election
7 March: 
Belize, City Councils and Town Councils
Sierra Leone, District Chairs, District Councils, Mayors and Local Councils 
11 March: 
Armenia, Mayors, Local Councils and Community Chiefs
Cuba, Provincial Assemblies
France
French Guiana, National Assembly by-election (2nd round)
Haute-Garonne, National Assembly by-election (1st round)
Germany, Frankfurt, 
Hong Kong, Hong Kong Island, Kowloon West, New Territories East and Architectural, Surveying, Planning and Landscape, Legislative Council 
India, Araria, Gorakhpur and Phulpur, House of the People by-elections
Japan, Ishikawa, Governor
12 March: India, Tripura, Charilam, Legislative Assembly state by-election
13 March: 
Bangladesh, Brahmanbaria-1 and Gaibandha-1, House of the Nation by-election
United States, Pennsylvania's 18th congressional district, U.S. House of Representatives special election
14 March: Mozambique, Nampula, Mayor by-election (2nd round)
17 March: Australia
Batman, House of Representatives by-election
South Australia, House of Assembly and Legislative Council
18 March: 
France
Haute-Garonne, National Assembly by-election (2nd round)
Loiret and Mayotte, National Assembly by-elections (1st round)
Mexico, Veracruz, 
Russia, Volgograd Oblast, 
20 March: United States, Cook County, Legalize Marijuana referendum
21 March: Netherlands, Municipal Councils
24 March: United States, Louisiana, Circuit Courts of Appeal special election
25 March: 
France, Loiret and Mayotte, National Assembly by-elections (2nd round)
Switzerland, Bern,  and Grand Council
Bernese Jura, 
Turkmenistan, District Councils and Municipal Councils
28 March: Namibia, Ncuncuni, National Assembly by-election
29 March: Bangladesh, Sub-district Councils and Union Councils, and Sub-district Council, Union Council and Ward by-elections
31 March: Sierra Leone, District Chairs, District Councils, Mayors and Local Councils

April
3 April: United States
Anchorage, Mayor and Bathroom Bill referendum
Wisconsin, Supreme Court and Court of Appeals, and Elimination of State Treasurer constitutional referendum
8 April: 
France, Overseas Residents, National Assembly by-election (1st round)
Japan, Kyoto, Governor
Switzerland, Obwalden, Executive Council (2nd round)
10 April: United States, Long Beach, Mayor and City Council (1st round)
12 April: The Gambia, 
15 April: 
France, Wallis and Futuna, National Assembly by-election
Germany, Thuringia, 
Switzerland, Geneva,  and 
16 April: India, Jharkhand, Municipal Corporations
20 April: India, Mizoram, Chakma Autonomous District, Council
22 April: 
Austria, Salzburg, Parliament
France, Overseas Residents, National Assembly by-election (2nd round)
Italy, Molise, Regional Council
Paraguay, 
23 April – 11 May: Australia, Melbourne, Lord Mayor by-election
24 April: United States, Arizona's 8th congressional district, U.S. House of Representatives special election
29 April: 
Italy, Friuli Venezia Giulia, Regional Council, and Mayors and Municipal Councils 
Switzerland
Appenzell Innerrhoden, Landsgemeinde
Ticino, referendum
Tunisia,

May
1 May: Canada, Nunatsiavut, Assembly
3 May: United Kingdom
Borough Councils, Unitary Authority and Mayors
Birmingham, City Council
Leeds, City Council
Liverpool, City Council (one third)
London, Mayors and Borough Councils
Manchester, City Council
Sheffield City Region, Mayor
West Tyrone, House of Commons by-election
5 May: 
Australia, Tasmania, (Hobart and Prosser) Legislative Council
United States, Arlington, City Council
6 May: 
Germany, Schleswig-Holstein, 
Switzerland
Geneva, 
Glarus, 
Tunisia, 
8 May: United States, Ohio, Regulate Congressional Redistricting 
9 May: Malaysia, state elections
Johor, Legislative Assembly
Kedah, Legislative Assembly
Kelantan, Legislative Assembly
Malacca, Legislative Assembly
Negeri Sembilan, Legislative Assembly
Pahang, Legislative Assembly
Penang, Legislative Assembly
Perak, Legislative Assembly
Perlis, Legislative Assembly
Sabah, Legislative Assembly
Selangor, Legislative Assembly
Terengganu, Legislative Assembly
12 May: 
The Gambia, 
India, Karnataka, Legislative Assembly
Kuwait, Municipal Council
Nigeria
Kaduna, Local Government Councils and Chairmen
Oyo, Local Government Councils and Chairmen
13 May: Italy, Friuli Venezia Giulia, Mayors and Municipal Councils (2nd round)
14 May: 
India, West Bengal, District Councils, Township Councils and Village Councils
Philippines, Ward Chairs, Ward Councils, Youth Chairs and Youth Councils
15 May: 
Bangladesh, Khulna, Mayor and City Corporation
United States
Idaho, Supreme Court and Court of Appeals
Portland, City Commission (1st round)
18–19 May: Czech Republic, Zlín district 78, Senate (1st round)
20 May: 
Italy, Aosta Valley, Regional Council, Mayors and Municipal Councils
Montenegro, Municipal Assemblies
Tunisia, 
22 May: United States
Arkansas, Supreme Court and Court of Appeals
Georgia, Supreme Court and Court of Appeals
23 May: Solomon Islands, Gizo/Kolombangara, National Parliament by-election
24 May: United States, Nashville, Mayor
25–26 May: Czech Republic, Zlín district 78, Senate (2nd round)
26 May: 
Iceland, Municipal Councils
Nigeria, Nasarawa, Local Government Councils and Chairmen
27 May: 
Italy, Trentino-Alto Adige/Südtirol, Mayors and Municipal Councils
Montenegro, Municipal Assemblies
Podgorica, City Assembly
28 May: India, Bhandara–Gondiya, Kairana, Nagaland and Palghar, House of the People

June
3 June: Brazil, Tocantins, Governor by-election (1st round)
5 June: United States
Fresno, City Council (1st round)
Long Beach, City Council (2nd round)
Los Angeles County, Board of Supervisors
Orange County, CA, Board of Supervisors and District Attorney (1st round)
Riverside County, Board of Supervisors (1st round)
Sacramento, City Council
San Bernardino County, Board of Supervisors
San Diego County, Board of Supervisors (1st round)
San Francisco, Mayor
Santa Clara County, Board of Supervisors (1st round)
San Jose, Mayor and City Council (1st round)
7 June: 
Bermuda, Warwick North East, House of Assembly by-election
Canada, Ontario, Legislative Assembly
9 June: New Zealand, Northcote, House of Representatives by-election
10 June: 
Armenia, Mayors, Local Councils and Community Chiefs
Italy, Mayors and Municipal Councils (1st round)
Japan, Niigata, Governor
Switzerland
Basel-Landschaft, 
Basel-Stadt, referendums
Fribourg, 
Geneva, referendums
Glarus, Landrat
Grisons, Executive Council and Grand Council (1st round)
Jura, referendums
Lucerne, 
Nidwalden, referendum
Schaffhausen, referendums
Schwyz, 
Solothurn, 
St. Gallen, 
Valais, referendum
Zug, 
Zürich, 
12 June: United States, Maine, Ranked-Choice Voting referendum
13 June: South Korea,
Busan Haeundae B, Cheonan A, Cheonan C, Gimcheon, Gimhae B, Gwangju Seo A, Incheon Namdong A, Jecheon–Danyang, Seoul Nowon C, Seoul Songpa B, Ulsan Buk and Yeongam–Muan–Sinan, National Assembly by-elections
Governors, Provincial Councils, Mayors, Municipal Councils and School Boards
Busan, 
Incheon, 
Seoul, Mayor
14 June: United Kingdom, Lewisham East, House of Commons by-election
16 June: Nigeria, Rivers, Local Government Councils and Chairmen
18 June: Canada, Chicoutimi—Le Fjord, House of Commons by-election
19 June: United States, Washington, D.C., Minimum Wage Parity for Tipped Workers referendum
24 June: 
Armenia, Mayors, Local Councils and Community Chiefs
Brazil, Tocantins, Governor by-election (2nd round)
Italy, Mayors and Municipal Councils (2nd round)
Japan, Shiga, Governor
Northern Cyprus, 
26 June: Bangladesh, Bagerhat-3, House of the Nation by-election
27 June: 
Bangladesh, Gazipur, Mayor and City Corporation
Indonesia, Governors, Regents and Mayors
30 June: 
Canada, Mohawk Council of Akwesasne
United States, Texas's 27th congressional district, U.S. House of Representatives

July
1 July: 
Mexico, State elections
Aguascalientes, 
Baja California Sur, 
Campeche, 
Chiapas, 
Chihuahua, 
Coahuila, 
Colima, 
Durango, 
Guanajuato, 
Guerrero, 
Hidalgo, 
Jalisco, 
Mexico City, 
Mexico State, 
Michoacán, 
Morelos, 
Nuevo León, 
Oaxaca, 
Puebla, 
Querétaro, 
Quintana Roo, 
San Luis Potosí, 
Sinaloa, 
Sonora, 
Tabasco, 
Tamaulipas, 
Tlaxcala, 
Veracruz, 
Yucatán, 
Zacatecas, 
Switzerland, Grisons, Grand Council (2nd round)
10 July: Uganda, County Councils and Parish Councils
14 July: Nigeria, Ekiti, Governor
25 July: 
Bangladesh, Kurigram-3, House of the Nation by-election
Pakistan
Balochistan, Provincial Assembly
Khyber Pakhtunkhwa, Provincial Assembly
Punjab, Provincial Assembly
Sindh, Provincial Assembly
26 July: Zambia, Lusaka, Mayor
28 July: Australia, Braddon, Fremantle, Longman, Mayo and Perth, House of Representatives by-elections
30 July: 
Bangladesh
Barisal, Mayor and City Corporation
Rajshahi, Mayor and City Corporation
Sylhet, Mayor and City Corporation
Zimbabwe, Urban Councils, District Councils and Ward Councils
31 July: Liberia, Bong and Montserrado, Senate by-elections

August
5 August: Japan, Nagano, Governor
7 August: United States
Ohio's 12th congressional district, U.S. House of Representatives special election
Missouri, Right to Work Repeal referendum
11 August: 
Nigeria
Katsina North and Bauchi South, Senate by-elections
Lokoja, House of Representatives by-election
United States, Honolulu, City Council (1st round)
15 August: Uganda, Arua, Parliament by-election
17 August: Kenya, Baringo South, National Assembly by-election
25 August: Nigeria, Imo, Local Government Councils and Chairmen
26 August: Japan, Kagawa, Governor
27 August: India, Ladakh, Kargil District, Ladakh Autonomous Hill Development Council
28 August: United States
Mesa, City Council (1st round)
Miami-Dade County, County Commission
Tulsa, City Council
31 August: India, Karnataka, City Corporations, Municipal Councils and Town Councils

September
1 September: Mauritania,  and 
6 September: Zambia, Kasenengwa, National Assembly by-election
9 September: 
Russia, 
Altai Krai, 
Amur Oblast,  and District 71, State Duma by-election
Arkhangelsk Oblast, 
Bashkortostan, 
Buryatia, People's Khural
Chukotka Autonomous Okrug, 
Irkutsk Oblast, 
Ivanovo Oblast,  and 
Kaliningrad Oblast, State Duma by-election
Kalmykia, People's Khural
Kemerovo Oblast,  and 
Khabarovsk Krai, Governor (1st round)
Khakassia, Head (1st round) and Supreme Council
Krasnoyarsk Krai, 
Magadan Oblast, 
Moscow, Mayor
Moscow Oblast, Governor
Nenets Autonomous Okrug, 
Nizhny Novgorod Oblast,  and District 129, State Duma by-election
Novosibirsk Oblast, 
Omsk Oblast, 
Oryol Oblast, 
Primorsky Krai, Governor (1st round) (election nullified)
Pskov Oblast, Governor
Rostov Oblast, Legislative Assembly
Saratov Oblast, District 163 and District 165, State Duma by-elections
Smolensk Oblast, Duma
Tver Oblast, District 180, State Duma by-election
Tyumen Oblast, 
Ulyanovsk Oblast, 
Vladimir Oblast, Governor (1st round) and 
Voronezh Oblast, 
Yakutia,  and State Assembly
Yaroslavl Oblast, Duma
Zabaykalsky Krai, 
Sweden, County Councils and Municipal Councils
15 September: Mauritania,  and 
16 September: 
Russia, Primorsky Krai, Governor (2nd round) (election nullified)
Tanzania, Korogwe, Monduli and Ukonga, National Assembly by-elections
19 September: India, Punjab, District Councils and Township Councils
22 September: Nigeria, Osun, Governor
23 September: 
Armenia, Yerevan, City Council
France, Réunion, National Assembly by-election (1st round)
Russia
Vladimir Oblast, Governor (2nd round)
Khabarovsk Krai, Governor (2nd round)
Switzerland
Aargau, 
Appenzell Ausserrhoden, 
Grisons, 
Lucerne, 
Nidwalden, referendum
Obwalden, referendum
St. Gallen, 
Thurgau, 
Ticino, referendum
Zürich, 
24 September: Canada, New Brunswick, Legislative Assembly
30 September: 
France, Réunion, National Assembly by-election (2nd round)
Iraq, Kurdistan Region, National Assembly
Japan, Okinawa, Governor

October
1 October: Canada, Quebec, National Assembly
5–6 October: Czech Republic, Municipal Councils
6 October: Gabon, 
7 October: 
Bosnia and Herzegovina
Federation of Bosnia and Herzegovina, House of Representatives and Cantonal Assemblies
Republika Srpska, President and National Assembly
Brazil, Governors (1st round) and Legislative Assemblies
India, Maharashtra, Village Councils (1st phase)
Peru, Governors, Regional Councils, Mayors and Municipal Councils
São Tomé and Príncipe, 
Príncipe, 
Switzerland, Zug,  and 
8 October: India, Jammu and Kashmir, Municipal Corporations and Municipal Councils (1st phase)
8–30 October: Australia, Tasmania, Mayors, Deputy Mayors and Local Councils
10 October: 
India, Jammu and Kashmir, Municipal Corporations and Municipal Councils (2nd phase)
Mozambique, Mayors and Municipal Councils
Nigeria, Plateau, Local Government Councils and Chairmen
13 October: 
India, Jammu and Kashmir, Municipal Corporations and Municipal Councils (3rd phase)
Ivory Coast, 
Malaysia, Port Dickson, House of Representatives by-election
14 October: 
Belgium, Provincial Councils, Municipal Councils, Social Welfare Councils and Antwerp District Councils
Germany, Bavaria, Parliament, 
India, Maharashtra, Village Councils (2nd phase)
16 October: India, Jammu and Kashmir, Municipal Corporations and Municipal Councils (4th phase)
20 October: 
Australia, Wentworth, House of Representatives by-election
Canada, British Columbia, Mayors and Municipal Councils
Vancouver, Mayor, Park Board, School Board and City Council
Jordan, Al-Muwaqqar, Governorate Council, Mayors and Municipal Councils (revote)
21 October: 
Armenia, Mayors, Local Councils and Community Chiefs
Italy
South Tyrol, Provincial Council
Trentino, President and Provincial Council
Verbano-Cusio-Ossola, 
Pakistan, NA-247, National Assembly by-election
Poland, Provincial Assemblies, County Councils, Commune Councils and Commune Heads (1st round)
22 October: Canada, Ontario, County Councils, Mayors, Regional Councils, Reeves, District Councils and School Boards
Toronto, Mayor, City Council and School Boards
22 October – 9 November: Australia, South Australia, Mayors, District Councils, Regional Councils, City Councils, Town Councils and Aboriginal Councils
22 October – 7 December: Canada, British Columbia, Electoral Reform referendum
24 October: Canada, Manitoba, Mayors, Municipal Councils and School Boards
28 October: 
Brazil, Governors (2nd round)
Germany, Hesse, Parliament and 
Japan, Fukushima, Governor
Kazakhstan, Regional Councils and City Councils
30 October: Israel, Regional Heads, Regional Councils, Municipal Heads, Municipal Councils, Local Heads and Local Councils (1st round)

November
3 November: 
India, Bellary, Mandya and Shimoga, House of the People by-elections
Myanmar
Kanpetlet, Lechar, Myingyan and Tamwe, House of Representatives by-elections
Myitkyina, House of Nationalities by-election
4 November: 
Poland, Commune Heads (2nd round)
Serbia, National Minorities Councils
5 November: Canada, Prince Edward Island, Mayors and Charlottetown City Council
6 November: 
Federated States of Micronesia
Kosrae, Governor, Lieutenant Governor (1st round) and State Legislature
Yap, Governor and State Legislature
Northern Mariana Islands, Mayors, Municipal Councils and Boards of Education
United States, Midterm elections
Michigan's 13th congressional district, U.S. House of Representatives 
Minnesota, U.S. Senate special election
Mississippi, U.S. Senate special election (1st round)
Navajo Nation, President, Board of Education, Board of Election Supervisors, Council and Referendum
Washington, D.C., Mayor, Attorney General and Council
Alabama
Governor, Lieutenant Governor, Attorney General, Auditor, Board of Education, Commissioner of Agriculture and Industries, Public Service Commission, Secretary of State and Treasurer
House of Representatives and Senate
Supreme Court, Court of Civil Appeals and Court of Criminal Appeals
Ten Commandments and Abortion constitutional referendums
Alaska
Governor
House of Representatives and Senate
Salmon Habitat Protection referendum
Arizona
Governor, Attorney General, Corporation Commission, Mine Inspector, Secretary of State, Superintendent of Public Instruction and Treasurer
House of Representatives and Senate
Supreme Court and Court of Appeals retention elections
Prohibit New Taxes on Services and Renewable Energy Standards constitutional referendums, and Clean Election referendum
Mesa, City Council (2nd round)
Phoenix, Mayor special election (1st round)
Arkansas
Governor, Lieutenant Governor, Attorney General, Auditor, Commissioner of State Lands, Secretary of State and Treasurer
House of Representatives and Senate
Voter ID constitutional referendum and Minimum Wage referendum
California
Governor, Lieutenant Governor, Attorney General, Board of Equalization, Controller, Insurance Commissioner, Secretary of State, Superintendent of Public Instruction and Treasurer
Assembly and Senate
Supreme Court and Court of Appeals retention elections
Local Rent Control and Farm Animal Confinement referendums
Bakersfield, City Council
Fresno, City Council (2nd round)
Oakland, Mayor and City Council
Orange County, Board of Supervisors and District Attorney (2nd round)
Riverside County, Board of Supervisors (2nd round)
San Diego County, Board of Supervisors (2nd round)
San Diego, City Council
San Francisco, Board of Supervisors
Santa Clara County, Board of Supervisors (2nd round)
San Jose, City Council (2nd round)
Colorado
Governor, Attorney General, Board of Education, Secretary of State and Treasurer
House of Representatives and Senate
Supreme Court and Court of Appeals retention elections
Independent Congressional Redistricting Commission, Independent State Legislative Redistricting Commission, Graduated Income Tax, Compensation for Property Value Loss Due to State Regulation and Campaign Contribution Limits  and  Limits and Fracking referendums
Connecticut
Governor, Attorney General, Comptroller, Secretary of the State and Treasurer
House of Representatives and Senate
Legislative Requirements to Privatize State Property 
Delaware
Attorney General, Auditor and Treasurer
House of Representatives and Senate
Florida
Governor, Attorney General, Chief Financial Officer and Commissioner of Agriculture
House of Representatives and Senate
Supreme Court and District Courts of Appeal retention elections
Two-Thirds Vote of Legislature to Increase Taxes constitutional referendum, and Prohibit Courts from Deferring to Administrative Agency Interpretations and Ban Offshore Drilling referendums
Broward County, Commission
Georgia
Governor, Lieutenant Governor, Attorney General, Commissioner of Agriculture, Commissioner of Insurance, Commissioner of Labor, Public Service Commission, Secretary of State and Superintendent of Schools
House of Representatives and Senate
Hawaii
Governor and Office of Hawaiian Affairs Board of Trustees
House of Representatives and Senate
Constitutional Convention referendum
Honolulu, City Council (2nd round)
Idaho
Governor, Lieutenant Governor, Attorney General, Controller, Secretary of State, Treasurer and Superintendent of Public Instruction
House of Representatives and Senate
Medicaid Expansion referendum
Illinois
Governor, Attorney General, Comptroller, Secretary of State and Treasurer
House of Representatives and Senate
Supreme Court and Appellate Court retention elections, and Appellate Court
Cook County, Assessor, Board of Commissioners, Board of Commissioners President, Board of Review, Clerk, Sheriff, Treasurer, Water Reclamation District Board, and $13 Minimum Wage, Earned Sick Time and Gun Dealer Penalties referendums
Chicago, Plastic Straws Ban referendum
Indiana
Auditor, Secretary of State and Treasurer
House of Representatives and Senate
Supreme Court and Court of Appeals retention elections
Require Balanced Budget constitutional referendum
Iowa
Governor, Attorney General, Auditor, Secretary of Agriculture, Secretary of State and Treasurer
House of Representatives and Senate
Court of Appeals retention elections
Kansas
Governor, Attorney General, Board of Education, Commissioner of Insurance, Secretary of State and Treasurer
House of Representatives
Court of Appeals retention elections
Kentucky
House of Representatives and Senate
Supreme Court and Court of Appeals
Louisville, Mayor and Metropolitan Council
Louisiana
Public Service Commission and Secretary of State
Supreme Court and Circuit Courts of Appeal
Unanimous Jury Verdict constitutional referendum
Maine
Governor
House of Representatives and Senate
Maryland
Governor, Attorney General and Comptroller
House of Delegates and Senate
Court of Appeals and Court of Special Appeals retention elections
Election-Day Voter Registration constitutional referendum
Massachusetts
Governor, Attorney General, Auditor, Governor's Council, Secretary of the Commonwealth and Treasurer
House of Representatives and Senate
Advisory Commission for Amendments to the U.S. Constitution Regarding Corporate Personhood and Political Spending, Gender Identity Anti-Discrimination and Nurse-Patient Assignment Limits referendums
Michigan
Governor, Attorney General, Board of Education and Secretary of State
House of Representatives and Senate
Supreme Court and Court of Appeals
Independent Redistricting Commission and Voting Policies  and Marijuana Legalization referendum
Wayne County, Executive and Commission
Minnesota
Governor, Attorney General, Auditor and Secretary of State
House of Representatives
Supreme Court and Court of Appeals
Mississippi
Supreme Court and Court of Appeals
Lobbying, Campaign Finance, and Redistricting constitutional referendum
Missouri
Auditor
House of Representatives and Senate
Supreme Court and Court of Appeals retention elections
Medical Marijuana constitutional referendums, and Medical Marijuana and Minimum Wage referendums
Montana
Public Service Commission
House of Representatives and Senate
Supreme Court
Medicaid Expansion and New Mine Requirements referendums
Nebraska
Governor, Attorney General, Auditor, Board of Education, Public Service Commission, Secretary of State and Treasurer
Legislature
Medicaid Expansion referendum
Nevada
Governor, Lieutenant Governor, Attorney General, Controller, Secretary of State and Treasurer
Assembly and Senate
Supreme Court
Energy Market and Renewable Energy Standards constitutional referendums, and Automatic DMV Voter Registration referendum
Clark County, County Commission
New Hampshire
Governor and Executive Council
House of Representatives and Senate
Taxpayer Right to Legal Action Against Government and Right to Privacy constitutional referendums
New Mexico
Governor, Attorney General, Auditor, Commissioner of Public Lands, Public Education Commission, Public Regulation Commission, Secretary of State and Treasurer
House of Representatives
Court of Appeals retention election, and Supreme Court and Court of Appeals
Legislature Regulation of Judicial Appeal Process constitutional referendum
New York
Governor, Attorney General and Comptroller
Assembly and Senate
North Carolina
House of Representatives and Senate
Supreme Court and Court of Appeals
Eliminate Gubernatorial Appoints to Elections Board and Voter ID constitutional referendums
North Dakota
Agriculture Commissioner, Attorney General, Public Service Commission, Secretary of State and Tax Commissioner
House of Representatives and Senate
Supreme Court
Electoral Campaign Regulations and Only Citizens Can Vote  and Marijuana Legalization referendum
Ohio
Governor, Attorney General, Auditor, Board of Education, Secretary of State and Treasurer
House of Representatives and Senate
Supreme Court and District Courts of Appeals
Drug Crime Policies constitutional referendums
Oklahoma
Governor, Lieutenant Governor, Attorney General, Auditor, Corporation Commissioner, Commissioner of Insurance, Commissioner of Labor, Superintendent of Public Instruction and Treasurer
House of Representatives and Senate
Supreme Court, Court of Criminal Appeals and Court of Civil Appeals retention elections
Eliminate Lieutenant Governor Elections constitutional referendum, and Medical Marijuana referendum
Oregon
Governor and Commissioner of Labor
House of Representatives and Senate
Supreme Court and Court of Appeals
Ban Public Funds for Abortions and Remove Affordable Housing Funding Restrictions constitutional referendums, and Repeal Limits on Local Law Enforcement Cooperation with ICE referendum
Portland, City Commission (2nd round)
Pennsylvania
Governor
House of Representatives and Senate
Rhode Island
Governor, Lieutenant Governor, Attorney General, Secretary of State and Treasurer
House of Representatives and Senate
South Carolina
Governor, Attorney General, Commissioner of Agriculture, Comptroller, Secretary of State, Superintendent of Education and Treasurer
House of Representatives
Appointed Superintendent of Education constitutional referendum
South Dakota 
Governor, Attorney General, Auditor, Commissioner of Public Lands, Public Utilities Commission, Secretary of State and Treasurer
House of Representatives and Senate
Supreme Court retention election
Election Policies and 55% Supermajority for Amendments 
Tennessee
Governor
House of Representatives and Senate
Texas
Governor, Lieutenant Governor, Attorney General, Board of Education, Commissioner of Agriculture, Commissioner of the General Land Office, Comptroller and Railroad Commissioner
House of Representatives and Senate
Supreme Court, Court of Criminal Appeals and Courts of Appeals
Austin, Mayor and City Council (1st round)
Bexar County, Commissioners Court
Dallas County, Commissioners Court
Harris County, Commissioners Court
Tarrant County, Commissioners Court
Utah
Board of Education
House of Representatives and Senate
Supreme Court and Court of Appeals retention elections
Independent Redistricting Commission, Medicaid Expansion and Medical Marijuana referendums
Vermont
Governor, Lieutenant Governor, Attorney General, Auditor, Secretary of State and Treasurer
House of Representatives and Senate
Virginia
Virginia Beach, Mayor special election and City Council
Washington
House of Representatives and Senate
Supreme Court and Court of Appeals
Gun Restrictions and Police Liability referendums
West Virginia
House of Delegates and Senate
Abortion constitutional referendum
Wisconsin
Governor, Attorney General, Secretary of State and Treasurer
Assembly and Senate
Wyoming
Governor, Auditor, Secretary of State, Superintendent of Public Instruction and Treasurer
House of Representatives and Senate
7 November: Canada, Nunavik, Kativik Regional Government Council
10 November: Slovakia, City Mayors, City Councils, Municipal Mayors and Municipal Councils
11 November: Russia, Khakassia, Head (2nd round)
12 November: India, Chhattisgarh, Legislative Assembly (1st phase)
13 November: 
Canada, Calgary, 2026 Olympics Bid referendum
Israel, Regional Heads, Municipal Heads and Local Heads (2nd round)
17 November: India, Jammu and Kashmir, Block Development Councils and Village Councils (1st phase)
18 November: 
France, Essonne, National Assembly by-election (1st round)
India, Uttarakhand, Mayors, Municipal Corporations, Municipal Chairs, Municipal Councils, Town Chairs and Town Councils
Japan, Ehime, 
Slovenia, Mayors (1st round) and Municipal Councils
20 November: 
India
Chhattisgarh, Legislative Assembly (2nd phase)
India, Jammu and Kashmir, Block Development Councils and Village Councils (2nd phase)
Liberia, Montserrado District 13, House of Representatives by-election
Tuvalu, Funafuti, Parliament by-election
Zambia, Mangango, National Assembly by-election
24 November: 
Australia, Victoria, Legislative Assembly and Legislative Council
Bahrain, 
India, Jammu and Kashmir, Block Development Councils and Village Councils (3rd phase)
Taiwan, County Magistrates, County Councils, Township Mayors, Township Councils, Municipal Mayors, Municipal Councils, Borough Chiefs, Indigenous District Chiefs and Indigenous District Councillors
Zimbabwe, Mutoko North, House of Assembly by-election
25 November: 
France, Essonne, National Assembly by-election (2nd round)
Hong Kong, Kowloon West, Legislative Council by-election
Japan, Wakayama, Governor
Mexico, Chiapas, 
Switzerland
Aargau, 
Basel-Landschaft, 
Basel-Stadt, referendums
Bern, 
Grisons, 
St. Gallen, 
Uri, 
27 November: 
India, Jammu and Kashmir, Block Development Councils and Village Councils (4th phase)
United States, Mississippi, U.S. Senate special election (2nd round)
28 November: India
Madhya Pradesh, Legislative Assembly
Mizoram, Legislative Assembly
29 November: India, Jammu and Kashmir, Block Development Councils and Village Councils (5th phase)

December
1 December: 
Bahrain, 
Guernsey, Alderney, Parliament
India, Jammu and Kashmir, Block Development Councils and Village Councils (6th phase)
2 December: 
Slovenia, Mayors (2nd round)
Spain, Andalusia, Parliament
3 December: Canada, Leeds—Grenville—Thousand Islands and Rideau Lakes, House of Commons by-election
4 December: India, Jammu and Kashmir, Block Development Councils and Village Councils (7th phase)
5 December: India, Assam, District Councils, Township Councils and Village Councils (1st phase)
7 December: India
Rajasthan, Legislative Assembly
Telangana, Legislative Assembly
8 December: India, Jammu and Kashmir, Block Development Councils and Village Councils (8th phase)
9 December: 
India, Assam, District Councils, Township Councils and Village Councils (2nd phase)
Japan, Ibaraki, 
Venezuela, Municipal Councils
11 December: 
India, Jammu and Kashmir, Block Development Councils and Village Councils (9th phase)
United States, Austin, City Council (2nd round)
12 December: Guernsey, Sark, Parliament
16 December: 
India, Haryana, Municipal Corporations and Municipal Councils
Ivory Coast, Regional Councils and Municipal Councils by-elections
Japan, Saga, Governor
Russia, Primorsky Krai, Governor (revote)
23 December: 
Japan, Miyazaki, Governor
Mexico, Nuevo León, 
27 December: Ghana, New Regions referendums
30 December: 
Democratic Republic of the Congo, 
India, Punjab, Village Heads and Village Councils

References

2018 elections
2018
Political timelines of the 2010s by year
local